Sekgoma (or Sekhome) II (1869 – November 17, 1925) was the king of the Bamangwato people of Bechuanaland in modern-day Botswana.

He was the son of King Khama III by his first wife, Mma-Besi. In 1923, Sekgoma II ascended the throne at the age of 54 upon the death of his father. However, his reign was short and only lasted two years. Sekgoma's son, Seretse II, was too young at the time to ascend the throne, and Tshekedi Khama, Sekgoma's younger brother, acted as regent.

References 
 http://www.uq.net.au/~zzhsoszy/states/botswana/bamangwato.html
 
 

1869 births
1925 deaths
Botswana chiefs